Karl Haist (born 22 April 1938 in Munich) is a sailor from Germany, together with Martin Zeileis (midperson) and Patrick Wichmann (foredeck), Haist won, as helmsman, second place during the 2012 European Soling Championship. With this team he became the Best Europeans in this series. Furthermore, Haist won the Soling World Trophy in 2011

Sailing career
Karl Haist has a long and impressive sailing career as helmsman since the mid 50's of the 20th century in the Flying Dutchman and Soling. He is specialized in regatta's on lakes and in light air conditions. Karl holds several national Soling titles in Austria, Germany and Hungary and celebrated many victories in European regatta's like the Omega Cup (GER), Erich Hirt Pokal (GER), Alpen Cup and the Trofeo Dino Schiesaro (ITA). Haist is Ehrenmitglied of the Bayerischer Yacht-Club and life member of the International Soling Association.

Sailing management
From 1983 till 1986 Karl was President of the International Soling Association. Karl Haist had two major objectives for his presidency: First he wanted a large Soling event in Eastern Europe. He succeeded in this by having the 1985 Soling European Championship held in Balatonfüred, Hungary and the 1986 Europeans in Warnemünde, East Germany. The second objective, bringing the operational cost of the Soling down by reducing the number of sails during a championship, took more time. This rule was effectuated in March 1989. This rule change reduced the number of mainsails from 2 to 1 and the number of large spinnakers also back from 2 to 1.

Professional career
Haist is retired as Diplom-Ingenieur in the Munich area.

References

1938 births
Living people
German male sailors (sport)
Sportspeople from Munich
Soling class sailors
Flying Dutchman class sailors